is a Japanese  shōjo manga series written and illustrated by Akimi Yoshida and published by Shogakukan. It has 12 volumes, the first published on 11 December 1996 and the last on 23 August 2002. It was adapted into a Japanese television drama series in 2000. A sequel manga series, Eve no Nemuri, has five volumes, the first published on 26 January 2004 and the last on 20 December 2005.

Reception
It won the 47th Shogakukan Manga Award for shōjo manga. Eve no Nemuri was nominated for the 10th Tezuka Osamu Cultural Prize.

References

External links

2000 Japanese television series debuts
2000 Japanese television series endings
Akimi Yoshida
Josei manga
Shogakukan manga
Shōjo manga
TV Asahi original programming
Winners of the Shogakukan Manga Award for shōjo manga